Maria Kurjo (born 10 December 1989) is a German diver. She competed in the 10 metre platform event at the 2012 Summer Olympics, finishing in 17th place. At the 2016 Summer Olympics, she competed in the 10 m platform event. She finished 21st in the preliminary round and did not advance to the semifinal.

References

1989 births
Living people
German female divers
Divers from Berlin
Divers at the 2012 Summer Olympics
Divers at the 2016 Summer Olympics
Olympic divers of Germany
20th-century German women
21st-century German women